Cui or CUI may refer to:

People
 Cui (surname), a Chinese surname
 Cui Shian (born 1957), governor of Macau
 César Cui (1835–1918), Russian composer

Education 
 Catholic University of Ireland
 COMSATS University Islamabad
 Concordia University Irvine

Science and technology 
 Character-based user interface
 Copper(I) iodide (CuI)
 Corrosion under insulation
 Cubic inch, a unit of volume
 Hamburg Centre for Ultrafast Imaging, a German research institute

Other uses
 Cui (character), a character in Dragon Ball media
 Controlled Unclassified Information, in the United States
 Cuiba language
 Cui-ui, a fish endemic to Pyramid Lake in northwestern Nevada
 Cui (or cuy), a Peruvian term for the guinea pig, when used as food

See also 
 Cui bono, "To whose benefit?", a Latin adage used to suggest a hidden motive
 Choi (Korean version of the Chinese surname Cui)